Prince Henry of Prussia (14 August 1862 – 20 April 1929) was a younger brother of German Emperor William II and a Prince of Prussia. He was also a grandson of Queen Victoria. A career naval officer, he held various commands in the Imperial German Navy and eventually rose to the rank of Grand Admiral and Generalinspekteur der Marine.

Biography

Born in Berlin, Prince Henry was the third child and second son of eight children born to Crown Prince Frederick William (later Emperor Frederick III), and Victoria, Princess Royal (later Empress Victoria and in widowhood Empress Frederick), eldest daughter of the British Queen Victoria. Henry was three years younger than his brother, the future Emperor William II (born 27 January 1859). He was born on the same day as King Frederick William I "Soldier-King" of Prussia.

After attending the gymnasium in Kassel, which he left in the middle grades in 1877, the 15-year-old Henry entered the Imperial Navy cadet program. His naval education included a two-year voyage around the world (1878 to 1880), the naval officer examination (Seeoffizierhauptprüfung) in October 1880, and attending the German naval academy (1884 to 1886).

Early commands

As an imperial prince, Henry quickly achieved command. In 1887, he commanded a torpedo boat and simultaneously the First Torpedo Boat Division; in 1888 the Imperial yacht SMY Hohenzollern; from 1889 to 1890 the protected cruiser , the coastal defense ship , the ironclad  and the pre-dreadnought battleship .

Squadron commands

From 1897, Prince Henry commanded several naval task forces; these included an improvised squadron that took part with the East Asia Squadron in consolidating and securing the German hold on the region of Kiaochow and the port of Tsingtao in 1898. The prince's success was more of the diplomatic than the military variety; he became the first European potentate ever to be received at the Chinese imperial court. In 1899 he became officially the commander of the East Asia Squadron, later of a capital-ship squadron and in 1903 commander of the Baltic Sea naval station. From 1906 to 1909, Henry was commander of the High Seas Fleet. In 1909, he was promoted to Grand Admiral.

World War I

At the beginning of World War I, Prince Henry was named Commander-in-Chief of the Baltic Fleet. Although the means provided to him were far inferior to Russia's Baltic Fleet, he succeeded, until the 1917 Revolution, in putting Russian naval forces far on the defensive and hindered them from making attacks on the German coast. After the end of hostilities with Russia, his mission was ended, and Prince Henry simply left active duty. With the war's end and the dissolution of the monarchy in Germany, Prince Henry left the navy.

Family

On 24 May 1888, Henry married Princess Irene of Hesse and by Rhine, his first cousin. His dying father, German Emperor Frederick III and his mother Empress Victoria were in attendance. The marriage produced three children:

Their sons Waldemar and Heinrich were both hemophiliacs, a disease which they inherited through Irene from the maternal grandmother of both of their parents, Queen Victoria, who was a carrier.

Personality and private life

Henry received one of the first pilot's licenses in Germany, and was judged a spirited and excellent seaman. He was dedicated to modern technology and was able to understand quickly the practical value of technical innovations. A yachting enthusiast, Prince Henry became one of the first members of the Yacht Club of Kiel, established by a group of naval officers in 1887, and quickly became the club's patron.

Henry was interested in motor cars as well and supposedly invented a windshield wiper and, according to other sources, the car horn. 

In his honor, the Prinz-Heinrich-Fahrt (Prince Heinrich Tour) was established in 1908, like the earlier Kaiserpreis a precursor to the German Grand Prix. Henry and his brother William gave patronage to the Kaiserlicher Automobilclub (Imperial Automobile Club). From 1911 to 1914 the British car makers Vauxhall Motors produced a model, the C-10, which was called the "Vauxhall Prince Henry" in his honour after initially being built for participation in the 1911 race.

After the German Revolution, Henry lived with his family in Hemmelmark near Eckernförde, in Schleswig-Holstein. He continued with motor sports and sailing and even in old age was a very successful participant in regattas. He popularized the Prinz-Heinrich-Mütze ("Prince Henry cap"), which is still worn, especially by older sailors.

In 1899, Henry received an honorary doctorate (Doctor of Engineering honoris causa) from the Technical University of Berlin. Also in foreign countries he received numerous similar honors, including an honorary doctorate (LL.D.) from Harvard University in March 1902, during his visit to the United States.

Prince Henry died of throat cancer, as his father had, in Hemmelmark on 20 April 1929.

George Burroughs Torrey painted a portrait of him.

Naval career and advancement

 Unterleutnant zur See, 14 August 1872; Basic Training and Naval Academy 1877-1878
 Leutnant zur See, 18 October 1881; Training Cruises and Naval Academy 1878-1882
 Kapitänleutnant, 18 October 1884; Executive Officer, ironclad corvette , 1886
 Korvettenkapitän, 18 October 1887; Commander, 1st Torpedo Boat Division, 1887; Commander, Imperial Yacht SMY Hohenzollern, 1888
 Kapitän zur See, 27 January 1889; Commander, protected cruiser , 1889–1890; Commander, Armored Coastal Defense Ship SMS Beowulf, 1892; Commander, ironclad corvette , 1892–1894; Commander, pre-dreadnought battleship , 1894–1895
 Konteradmiral, 15 September 1895; Commander, 2nd Division, 1st Battle Squadron, 1896–1897; Commander, 2nd Division, Cruiser Squadron, 1897–1899
 Vizeadmiral, 5 December 1899; Commander, Cruiser Squadron, 1899–1900; Commander, 1st Battle Squadron, 1900–1903
 Admiral, 13 September 1901; Commanding Admiral, Baltic Sea Naval Command, 1903–1906, Commander, High Seas Fleet, 1906–1909
 Großadmiral, 4 September 1909; Inspector General of the Imperial Navy, 1909–1918; Commander-in-Chief, Baltic Fleet, 1914–1918

Regimental commissions and honorary ranks

German

 1. Garde-Regiment zu Fuß (Royal Prussian 1st Regiment of Foot Guards) – Leutnant (Second Lieutenant) through Generaloberst im Range eines Generalfeldmarschalls (Colonel-General in the Rank of Field Marshal), 1871 - 1918
 Kgl. Sächs. 2. Grenadier-Regiment Kaiser Wilhelm, König von Preußen Nr. 101 (Royal Saxon 2nd Grenadier Regiment)
 Kgl. Bayerisches Artillerie-Regiment Nr. 8 (Royal Bavarian 8th Artillery Regiment) – Generaloberst im Range eines Generalfeldmarschalls and Chef (Colonel in Chief)
 1. Großherzogl. Hessisches Feldartilleree-Regiment 25 (Grand Duchy of Hesse 2nd Artillery Regiment)
 Fußilier-Regiment “Prinz Heinrich von Preußen” (Brandenburgisches) Nr 35 (The Brandenburg Fusilier Regiment) - Generaloberst im Range eines Generalfeldmarschalls and Chef (Colonel in Chief)

Foreign

  Austria-Hungary: K.u.K. Infantry Regiment Nr. 20 – Oberstinhaber (Colonel in Chief)
  Austria-Hungary: K.u.K. Kriegsmarine (Navy) – Vizeadmiral (vice admiral)
 Austria-Hungary: K.u.K. Kriegsmarine - Konteradmiral (rear-admiral) 1899
  United Kingdom: Royal Navy – Admiral (Honorary) 13 September 1901
 Royal Navy - Vice-Admiral (Honorary) 5 February 1901.
  Russian Empire: Imperial Dragoon Regiment Nr. 33 – Colonel

Honours

National

Foreign

Honorary degrees and offices

 Freedom of the City of New York, 25 February 1902, during his visit to the city.
Freedom of the City of Philadelphia, 10 March 1902, during his visit to the city.
 Honorary doctorate (LL.D.) from Harvard University, 6 March 1902.

Ancestry

References

Further reading

Harald Eschenburg. Prinz Heinrich von Preußen - Der Großadmiral im Schatten des Kaisers. Heide, 1989, . [Translation of title: Prince Heinrich of Prussia - The Grand Admiral in the Shadow of the Emperor.]
John Van der Kiste. Prince Henry of Prussia. 2015

External links

 

1862 births
1929 deaths
Military personnel from Berlin
People from the Province of Brandenburg
Grand admirals of the Imperial German Navy
Prussian princes
Naval aviators
Colonel generals of Prussia
19th-century Prussian military personnel
Sons of emperors
Deaths from esophageal cancer
Imperial German Navy admirals of World War I
German expatriates in China
Deaths from cancer in Germany
Recipients of the Pour le Mérite (military class)
Grand Crosses of the Order of Saint Stephen of Hungary
Knights of the Golden Fleece of Spain
Grand Crosses of Naval Merit
Knights Grand Cross of the Royal Order of Kalākaua
Knights Grand Cross of the Order of Saints Maurice and Lazarus
Grand Crosses of the Order of the Star of Romania
2
2
Recipients of the Order of the White Eagle (Russia)
Recipients of the Order of Saint Stanislaus (Russian), 1st class
Recipients of the Order of St. Anna, 1st class
Knights of the Order of Saint Joseph
People stripped of a British Commonwealth honour
Recipients of the Order of the Netherlands Lion
Children of Frederick III, German Emperor
Sons of kings